Kim Swoo Geun (February 20, 1931 – June 14, 1986) was a prominent South Korean architect, educator, publisher and patron of artists. Along with architect Kim Joong Up (김중업), he is recognised as a significant contributor in the history of Korean architecture. With his support for diverse art genres of Korean culture, he was referred to as Lorenzo de Medici of Seoul by TIME in 1977.

Biography
Kim Swoo Geun was born the first son of Kim Yong-hwan (김용환) and Kim Usudal (김우수달) in Sinap-dong (신압동), Chongjin, North Hamgyong province. While Kim was in second year at Kyunggi Public Middle School (경기공립중학교), he began to take an interest in architecture, introduced by his English tutor and a US soldier.

After his graduation from the school in 1950 and Kim entered Seoul National University, majoring in architecture. In 1952, during the Korean War, he withdrew from the school and went abroad to Japan where he studied modern architecture at Tokyo National University of Fine Arts and Music. During his study at this school, he interned at Hirada Matsuda (松田平田)'s architectural firm. In 1960 he received a master's degree in architecture from Tokyo University where he finished his doctoral course as well.

In 1959, he won the competition for the National Assembly Building of South Korea, but his proposal was not realized due to the political situation at that time. In 1960, he returned to his country with his Japanese wife Michiko Yajima (矢島道子). He would eventually father three children with her. In 1961 he founded his architectural firm, "Kim Swoo Geun Planning and Design" (김수근 건축사무소), the predecessor of the current SPACE group. At the same time, he also began to teach at the architecture department of Hongik University.

Kim designed over 200 projects inside and outside of South Korea during his lifetime. His representative works include "SPACE Group building" (공간 사옥, 1978), "Masan Yangdeok Catholic Church" (마산양덕성당 1979), "Jinju National Museum" (진주국립박물관 1986) and "Olympic Main Stadium" (올림픽 경기장 1987), which feature his characteristic view of architecture as well as Korean traditional elements.

Kim commenced publishing the monthly SPACE (월간 공간) in 1966, the first general art journal of South Korea which contributes to recording and distributing Korean culture. Kim also established SPACE Love (공간사랑) in 1978, a small theater inside of the Space group building and built the SPACE Gallery in 1972, all of which has played an important role for numerous South Korean cultural campaigns. With his contributions crossing over into many diverse genres, Kim is regarded a seminal cultural activist, trying to integrate architecture and other genres of artistic expression.

After Kim Swoo Geun died in 1986, a victim of liver cancer at the age of 55, the Kim Swoo Geun Foundation (김수근문화재단) was established in his memory.

Recognition
According to Park Gil-ryong, a professor of Kukmin University, Kim was the first in South Korea to proclaim that architecture has to have its own concept and philosophy. The architect Min Hyun Sik said Kim Swoo Geun lived with the consciousness of how to effectively convey and adapt Korean tradition into contemporary architecture. It was his grand obsession. His achievement as an educator was in mentoring Kim Won, Ryu Chun-su, Min Hyun Sik, Lee Jong-ho, Seung Hyo-sang into being prominent architects, regarded as significant as well.

Selective works
 1963 Freedom Center (자유센터) in Jangchung-dong, Jung-gu, Seoul
 1967 Buyeo National Museum in Buyeo, South Chungcheong Province
 1969 Tower Hotel (타워호텔) in Jangchung-dong, Jung-gu, Seoul
 1970 Korea Exhibition Pavilion at Expo '70 (오사카 엑스포 한국관) in Osaka, Japan
 1971 SPACE Group Building (공간 사옥) in Wonseo-dong, Jongno-gu, Seoul
 1977 Seoul Olympic Stadium, in Jamsil, Songpa-gu, Seoul
 1979 Cheongju National Museum, in Cheongju, North Chungcheong Province
 1979 Munye Center and Fine Arts Center (종합문예회관, currently Arko Arts Museum) in Marronnier Park, Jongno-gu
 1979 Yangdeok Catholic Church (마산양덕성당) in Masan, South Gyeongsang Province
 1980 Kyungdong Presbyterian Church (경동교회) in Jangchung-dong, Jung-gu, Seoul
 1983 Embassy building of the United States in Seoul on Sejongno in Jongno-gu, Seoul
 1984 National Science Museum, South Korea in Yuseong-gu, Daejeon
 1985 Bulgwang-dong Catholic Church (불광동성당) in Bulgwang-dong, Eunpyeong-gu, Seoul

Honors
 1970 Civil Merit Medal, South Korea (국민포장 國民褒章)
 1971 Pan Pacific Citation from the American Institute of Architects (AIA)
 1979 Commendatore dell’ Ordine della Stella della Solidariet’ Italiana
 1982 Honorary Fellow from the American Institute of Architects (AIA)
 1984 Iron Tower, Order of Industrial Service Merit, South Korea (철탑산업훈장 鐵塔産業勳章)
 1986 Silver Tower, Order of Industrial Service Merit, South Korea (은탑산업훈장 銀塔産業勳章)

See also
Architecture of South Korea
List of tallest buildings in Seoul
National Assembly Building

References

External links
SPACE Magazine
Space Group (formerly Kim Su-keun's architectural firm)
Kim Swoo-geun Foundation

1931 births
1986 deaths
South Korean architects
Seoul National University alumni
Academic staff of Hongik University
Academic staff of Konkuk University
Academic staff of Kookmin University
University of Tokyo alumni
Tokyo University of the Arts alumni
People from Chongjin
Deaths from liver cancer
Recipients of the Order of Industrial Service Merit
20th-century South Korean architects